Teniente Vidal Airport is an airport serving Coyhaique, capital of the Aysén Region of Chile.

The runway has an additional  of unpaved overrun on the northeast end. There is a mountain nearby to the southeast, and rising terrain nearby northwest.

See also

Transport in Chile
List of airports in Chile

References

External links
[https://www.openstreetmap.org/#map=13/-45.5952/-72.0969 
Teniente Vidal Airport] at OpenStreetMap
Teniente Vidal Airport at OurAirports

Teniente Vidal Airport at FallingRain

Airports in Chile
Airports in Aysén Region